Semia is a genus of Asian cicadas in the tribe Cicadini, erected by Matsumura in 1917.

Species
The following are included by the Global Biodiversity Information Facility:
 Semia albusequi Emery, Lee & Pham, 2017
 Semia brevidilata Yang & Wei, 2014
 Semia gialaiensis Pham & Constant, 2013
 Semia hainanensis Yang & Wei, 2013
 Semia klapperichi Jacobi, 1944
 Semia lachna (Lei & Chou, 1997)
 Semia magna Emery, Lee & Pham, 2017
 Semia majuscula (Distant, 1917)
 Semia pallida Emery, Lee & Pham, 2017
 Semia spinosa Pham, Hayashi & Yang, 2012 - Vietnam
 Semia spiritus Emery, Lee & Pham, 2017
 Semia tibetensis Yang & Wei, 2014
 Semia watanabei (Matsumura, 1907) - type species (as Leptopsaltria watanabei Matsumura, 1907)

References

External Links

Auchenorrhyncha genera
Cicadini
Hemiptera of Asia